Gandak (also known as Ganduk) is a village in Doshman Ziari Rural District, in the Central District of Kohgiluyeh County, Kohgiluyeh and Boyer-Ahmad Province, Iran. At the 2006 census, its population was 682, in 123 families.

References 

Populated places in Kohgiluyeh County